Minab County is in Hormozgan province, Iran. The capital of the county is the city of Minab. At the 2006 census, the county's population was 254,304 in 50,478 households. The following census in 2011 counted 235,705 people in 56,106 households, by which time Byaban District had been separated from the county to form Sirik County. At the 2016 census, the county's population was 259,221 in 68,906 households.

Administrative divisions

The population history and structural changes of Minab County's administrative divisions over three consecutive censuses are shown in the following table. The latest census shows four districts, 11 rural districts, and four cities.

References

 

Counties of Hormozgan Province